The Mount Harkness Fire Lookout, on Mount Harkness in Lassen Volcanic National Park, in Plumas County, California near Mineral, California, was listed on the National Register of Historic Places in 2017.

It was built in 1931 to a "classic rustic NPS design".  It has a  cab with a log catwalk and railings, upon a  stone tower.

It is at elevation  and is staffed and open during the summer.

It is one of fewer than 40 operating National Park Service (NPS) fire lookouts in 2019.

It was destroyed by the July/August 2021 Dixie Fire.

References

Fire lookout towers in California
Fire lookout towers on the National Register of Historic Places
National Register of Historic Places in Plumas County, California
Buildings and structures completed in 1931
Park buildings and structures on the National Register of Historic Places in California
National Register of Historic Places in Lassen Volcanic National Park
National Park Service rustic in California
1931 establishments in California